"Marry Me" is a song recorded by American country music singer Thomas Rhett. It was released to country radio on November 20, 2017 via Valory Music Group as the third single from his third studio album, Life Changes (2017). The song was written by Rhett, Jesse Frasure, Ashley Gorley and Shane McAnally.

Background
"Marry Me" is a song where the narrator watches a desired woman marry someone else. It was quoted as "a clever ode to rejection" by StarTribune.com.

Commercial performance
The song peaked at No. 2 on the Hot Country Songs chart on February 17, 2018 where it stayed for 6 weeks. It reached No. 1 on Country Airplay for charts dated March 10, 2018. It was certified Platinum by the RIAA on March 13, 2018, and has sold 451,000 copies in the United States as of June 2018. By August 2021 it was certified 4× Platinum, for sales of an equivalent of 4,000,000 units.

Music video
The official music video was directed by TK McKamy and released on December 17, 2017 on Thomas Rhett's Vevo channel.

In the video, a young girl named Ellie is seen playing dress up with her dolls and imagining her wedding day. Sam, the boy next door, peeks through the window and watches it all unfold before heading out to play football. As the song progresses, their friendship develops and Ellie becomes his biggest fan at a high school football game. Later, at a local diner, he almost kisses her, only for the moment to be interrupted by one of his teammates, whom Ellie merely shrugs off as just a friend. However, Ellie later ends up engaged to that same person, and the pain causes Sam to leave the wedding after dropping off the gift he got for her, wrapped in the same tie-dyed T-shirt with his name on the back that Ellie used to wear to his games. Sam is later seen eating alone at the same diner, the same table where he nearly kissed Ellie, as he pours whiskey from his flask into a coffee cup. The video ends on a cliffhanger as Sam hears a tap on the window, only to find Ellie, still in her wedding dress, with tears in her eyes and the same confused shrug as the other night at the diner. One possible explanation for this is that Ellie's fiance left her standing at the altar and it made her realize she was ready to reciprocate Sam's feelings.

Rhett completes the story of Sam and Ellie in his 2019 video Remember You Young.

Charts

Weekly charts

Year-end charts

Certifications

Awards and nominations

References

2017 songs
2017 singles
Country ballads
2010s ballads
Thomas Rhett songs
Big Machine Records singles
Songs about marriage
Songs written by Thomas Rhett
Songs written by Jesse Frasure
Songs written by Ashley Gorley
Songs written by Shane McAnally
Song recordings produced by Dann Huff